Stigmella fasciola is a moth of the family Nepticulidae. It is known from Tajikistan.

External links
Nepticulidae and Opostegidae of the world

Nepticulidae
Moths of Asia
Moths described in 2003